Ammonium uranyl carbonate (UO2CO3·2(NH4)2CO3) is known in the uranium processing industry as AUC and is also called uranyl ammonium carbonate. This compound is important as a component in the conversion process of uranium hexafluoride (UF6) to uranium dioxide (UO2). The ammonium uranyl carbonate is combined with steam and hydrogen at 500–600 °C to yield UO2. In another process aqueous uranyl nitrate, known as uranyl nitrate liquor (UNL) is treated with ammonium bicarbonate to form ammonium uranyl carbonate as a solid precipitate. This is separated from the solution, dried with methanol and then calcinated with hydrogen directly to UO2 to obtain a sinterable grade powder. The ex-AUC uranium dioxide powder is free-flowing, relatively coarse (10 µ) and porous with specific surface area in the range of 5 m2/g and suitable for direct pelletisation, avoiding the granulation step. Conversion to UO2 is often performed as the first stage of nuclear fuel fabrication.

The AUC process is followed in South Korea and Argentina. In the AUC route, calcination, reduction and stabilization are simultaneously carried out in a vertical fluidized bed reactor. In most countries, sinterable grade UO2 powder for nuclear fuel is obtained by the ammonium diuranate (ADU) process, which requires several more steps.

Ammonium uranyl carbonate is also one of the many forms called yellowcake; in this case it is the product obtained by the heap leach process.

References

Extra reading

Ammonium compounds
Uranyl compounds
Carbonates
Nuclear materials